Drexel may refer to:

People
 Drexel (name)

Places
 Drexel, Missouri
 Drexel, North Carolina
 Drexel, Ohio
 Drexel Hill, Pennsylvania

Other uses 

 Disappearance of Brittanee Drexel
 Drexel Heritage, a furniture manufacturer 
 Drexel University
 Drexel Burnham Lambert, a now defunct investment bank
 Drexel Dragons, the athletic program of Drexel University
 The Drexel Collection of books about music and musical scores donated by Joseph William Drexel to The New York Public Library in 1888
 Drexel 4041, a 17th-century British music manuscript commonplace book
 Drexel 4257, a 17th-century British music manuscript commonplace book

See also
 Drexler